Mohamed Ghulom Abdul Rahman is a Bahraini shooter. He competed in the 1984 Summer Olympics.

References

Year of birth missing (living people)
Living people
Shooters at the 1984 Summer Olympics
Bahraini male sport shooters
Olympic shooters of Bahrain